Lytle is a ghost town located 12 miles south-west of Fountain in El Paso County, Colorado. The only building that remains is the Lytle School. The earlier name of the town was Turkey Creek. There was a Post Office from 1877 to 1881 and a Rural Post Office from 1885 to 1920.

See also
 List of ghost towns in Colorado

References

Former populated places in El Paso County, Colorado
Ghost towns in Colorado